Four ships of the Royal Netherlands Navy have been named  Karel Doorman or  Karel Doorman (rendered as  Karel Doorman in English) after Admiral Karel Doorman:

 The first , originally the escort carrier , was the Netherlands' first aircraft carrier.
She was sold to Argentina in 1970 and renamed 
 The third  is the lead ship of her class of frigates.
 The fourth  is a replenishment and logistic ship, which was commissioned in 2015.

See also
  of the Dutch Royal Navy
  of the Dutch Royal Navy

Royal Netherlands Navy ship names